Acalolepta rusticatrix is a species of beetle in the family Cerambycidae. It was described by Johan Christian Fabricius in 1801, originally under the genus Lamia. It is known from Myanmar, India, the Philippines, Malaysia, Sumatra, Sri Lanka, Java, Taiwan, Indonesia, Sulawesi, and Vietnam.

Subspecies
 Acalolepta rusticatrix bilitonensis (Breuning, 1953)
 Acalolepta rusticatrix formosensis Breuning & Ohbayashi, 1966 – endemic to Taiwan
 Acalolepta rusticatrix lombokensis Breuning, 1982
 Acalolepta rusticatrix rusticatrix (Fabricius, 1801)
 Acalolepta rusticatrix sumbawensis Breuning, 1970

References

Acalolepta
Beetles of Asia
Beetles described in 1801
Taxa named by Johan Christian Fabricius